This is a list of cricket grounds in Singapore.  The grounds included in this list have held List-A matches, all of which have come in the form of One Day Internationals.

References

External links
Cricket grounds in Singapore at CricketArchive.

Cricket in Singapore
Singapore

Cricket grounds
Cricket grounds